William Minot Guertler (10 March 1880 – 21 March 1959) was a German professor of metallurgy at the Technical University in Berlin. He contributed to the development of metallurgy as an engineering discipline in Germany and advanced metallography with a three volume treatise. He was a member of the NSDAP from 1931.

Life and work 
Guertler was born in Hannover to physician Alexander Guertler (1843–1931) and Grace née Sedgewick (1858–1931). He graduated from the Hamelin Gymnasium in 1899 and went to the technical school in Hannover followed by studies at the University of Munich and at the University of Göttingen where he completed his doctorate in 1904 under Gustav Tammann. He then worked as an assistant before moving to the Metallhüttenmännische Institut at Berlin in 1907. After habilitation in 1908, he spent a year in MIT. During World War I, he continued to work in Berlin and became an associate professor in 1917. In 1933 he became a full professor and in 1936 he moved to the technical school in Dresden.

Guertler married Felicitas de la Porte in 1908 and they had two daughters.

References

External links 
 Biography 

1880 births
1959 deaths
Academic staff of the Technical University of Berlin